Keena Turner (born October 22, 1958) is an American football executive and former player, coach, and broadcaster.  He was selected by the San Francisco 49ers in the second round of the 1980 NFL draft. A 6'2" 237 pound linebacker from Purdue University, Turner played in 11 NFL seasons and spent his entire career with the 49ers. A one time Pro Bowl selection, he retired from the 49ers with four Super Bowl rings. Turner famously played Super Bowl XVI with the chickenpox.

After his playing career ended, Turner served as a television co-host for 49ers pre-season games. Currently he serves as the team's vice president and senior advisor 
to the general manager.
 Turner and his wife Linda have three children, Sheena, Miles, and Ella.

Turner previously owned a car dealership in Tracy, California with former teammate Ronnie Lott.

Coaching career
From 1992 to 1994 Turner coached linebackers at Stanford under Bill Walsh.

References

External links
 San Francisco 49ers profile

1958 births
Living people
American automobile salespeople
American football linebackers
Purdue Boilermakers football players
San Francisco 49ers executives
San Francisco 49ers players
Stanford Cardinal football coaches
National Conference Pro Bowl players
Chicago Vocational High School alumni
Sportspeople from Chicago
People from Tracy, California
Players of American football from Chicago
African-American coaches of American football
African-American players of American football
21st-century African-American people
20th-century African-American sportspeople
Ed Block Courage Award recipients